Antonios Bountouris (born: 1950) is a sailor from Greece. who represented his country at the 1988 Summer Olympics in Busan, South Korea as crew member in the Soling. With helmsman Tassos Boudouris and fellow crew members Antonios Bountouris and Dimitrios Deligiannis they took the 18th place.

References

Living people
1950 births
Sailors at the 1988 Summer Olympics – Soling
Olympic sailors of Greece
Greek male sailors (sport)